The Amman International Stadium is a stadium in Al-Hussein City, Amman, Jordan. It is the largest stadium in Jordan. The stadium was built in 1964 and opened in 1968. It is owned by the Government of Jordan and operated by the Higher Council of Youth. It is also the home stadium of the Jordan national football team and Al-Faisaly SC. It has a current capacity of 17,619 spectators.

Usage
In addition to Jordan's home games, the stadium hosts other major games in Jordanian football as well including the Jordanian Pro League, Jordan FA Cup, Jordan FA Shield and Jordan Super Cup games.

It has also hosted other tournaments such as the 1988 Arab Nations Cup, 1996 Arab Cup Winners' Cup, 1999 Pan Arab Games, 2003 Arab Athletics Championships, 2005 WAFF Women's Championship, 2007 Arab Athletics Championships, 2007 WAFF Women's Championship, 2007 WAFF Championship, 2006–07 Arab Champions League Finals, 2007 AFC Cup Finals, 2007 Asian Athletics Championships, 2010 WAFF Championship and 2016 FIFA U-17 Women's World Cup games amongst many others.

References

External links
 Amman International Stadium at World Stadiums

Football venues in Jordan
Jordan
Athletics (track and field) venues in Jordan
Sports venues completed in 1968
1968 establishments in Jordan
Tourist attractions in Amman
Sports venues in Amman